Oliver Hudson Kelley (January 7, 1826 – January 20, 1913) was one of the key founders of the National Grange of the Order of Patrons of Husbandry,  a fraternal organization in the United States.

Biography
Kelley was born in Boston, moving to the Minnesota frontier in 1849, where he became a farmer. In 1864, he got a job as a clerk for the United States Bureau of Agriculture and traveled the Eastern and Southern United States following the American Civil War. He felt a great need to gather together farmers and their families to rebuild America as he once knew it, and thought an organization of fraternal strength would best serve the needs of the farm families.

As he traveled throughout the country, Kelley built partnerships that developed into the seven original founders of the Order of Patrons of Husbandry. On November 15, 1867, he laid the groundwork to build a new foundation for American agriculture through the organization of the Grange, of which he was the first secretary until he resigned in 1878.

The other founders of the Grange were William Saunders, Francis M. McDowell, John Trimble, Aaron B. Grosh, John R. Thompson, William M. Ireland, and Kelley's niece Caroline A. Hall.

Kelley was inducted into the National Agricultural Center and Hall of Fame on October 27, 2006. The Oliver Kelley Farm in Elk River, Minnesota, is maintained by the Minnesota Historical Society as a living history farm with interpreters giving people a taste of what Oliver Kelley's life was like on the farm in the 1850s frontier and giving a feel for modern Minnesota farming in a Farm Lab section since 2017.

In 1877, Kelley founded the town of Carrabelle, Florida, which he named for his niece.

Notes

Further reading 

 William D. Barns, "Oliver Hudson Kelley and the genesis of the Grange: A reappraisal." Agricultural History 41.3 (1967): 229-242 online.

  - See especially page 6 and pages 315 – 317.
 
 
 Spafford Area Historical Society
 The Founders of the Grange

External links 
Minnesota Historical Society: Oliver H. Kelley Farm
Friends of the Kelley Farm
National Agricultural Center and Hall of Fame
Oliver Hudson Kelley in MNopedia, the Minnesota Encyclopedia
Oliver Hudson Kelley (OHK) Grange, No. 834

1826 births
1913 deaths
People from Boston
History of agriculture in the United States
History of Minnesota
Agriculture in Minnesota
Burials at Rock Creek Cemetery
National Grange of the Order of Patrons of Husbandry